The monetary reform in the  Soviet Union of 1947 (known as the "postwar reform") was carried out during December 16–19, 1947. It was the second Soviet monetary reform. At the same time the post-World War II rationing system was discontinued. The reform was a combination of redenomination  and confiscation, the latter depending on the amount exchanged and whether the monies were kept at sberkassa or not. Amounts under 3,000 Rbls in private bank accounts were not revalued while cash had to be exchanged 10:1 for new roubles. State bonds were exchanged as well, under more favourable rules of denomination. The confiscative character was attributed to large amounts of counterfeit money produced by Nazi Germany, as well as to the desire to devalue the savings of the profiteers.

References

Finance in the Soviet Union
Reform in the Soviet Union
Economic history of Russia
Monetary reform
1947 in economics
1947 in the Soviet Union